Vera George Ghattas Baboun (born October 6, 1964) is a Palestinian politician and the first female mayor of Bethlehem. Baboun has a master's degree in African-American literature. Prior to her election, she became the principal of the Roman Catholic High School in Beit Sahour (2010-2012) and was an English literature lecturer at Bethlehem University, (1990-2010) where she was also the Assistant Dean of Students (2000-2006). Additionally, she is the chairperson of the Board of Directors for Guidance and Training Centre for Family and Children as well as a gender studies researcher in GRACE (Gender Research in Africa and the Middle East into ICTs for Empowerment) network looking at the role of information technology in empowering women in the Arab world. Baboun is the mother of five children.  She is a Palestinian Christian.

Political career

2012 October: Bethlehem Mayoral Elections
Baboun led the Independence and Development bloc, made up of 12 Muslims and Christians in the Fatah movement campaigning to improve services and promote the tourism potential of Bethlehem. Her bloc was described generally as professionals and technocrats by Al-Ghad. Few expected Baboun to win. She ran against well-known male candidates as well as individuals supported by Islamists and left-wing Palestinians. By 12 Oct 2012, Fatah was leading polling by AWRAD research centre at 49%. Her bloc won the election on 20 Oct 2012 and Baboun was officially chosen as mayor in a closed session of the Bethlehem Municipal Council by the nine council members of her bloc who were popularly elected. Her opponents got six seats on the council.

Mayor of Bethlehem
As mayor, Baboun presides over a city with the highest unemployment in the West Bank. Bethlehem has a changing demographic, due to an outflux of the Christian population. She cites the presence of the Israeli West Bank barrier as an obstacle to growth by restricting the movement of people, ideas and goods. Of Bethlehem she states, "We are a strangulated city, with no room for expansion due to the settlements and the wall." She hopes to stop the flow of emigration by creating job opportunities for young people. She also hopes to regain international support lost while Hamas was in power. Baboun terminated her post on April 27, 2017. She did not participate in the local elections that took place in Bethlehem and all the West Bank in May 2017.

Palestinian Ambassador to Chile 
On December 8, 2022: she being appointed as the Ambassador of the State of Palestine to Chile.

Writings

Books and Papers  
2016: Pour l'amour de Bethléem, Ma Ville Emmurée, published by Bayard Editions.Paris
2014: Women and ICT in Africa and The Middle East; Changing Selves, Changing Societies. The book includes 27 gender researches by woman researchers from the MENA area in GRACE research network. My research entitled:  Scheherazades of Today: Young Palestinian women use film, radio and social networking platforms to speak up and change, published by Zedbooks.UK
2012: "Edward Said: A Mentor Who Mastered Speaking Truth to Power" article published by This Week in Palestine

Awards 
2017 May 14th: Received le Prix littéraire de l'Œuvre d'Orient on' Pour l'amour de Bethléem, Ma ville emmurée published by Bayard Paris, France.
2016 November 15: The Issam M Fares Award for Exellence from the Middle East Institute in Washington DC, USA.AWARD PRESENTATION for Vera Baboun and SPEECH2016 June 17: The "Premio Internazionale Giovanni Paolo II, XII Edition Salerno-Italy for defending and promoting the sacredness of life, in harmony with the Christian principles. Italy.
2016 July 14th: Conferred the Honorary Freeman of the Town of Quatre Bornes, Mauritius.
2016 May 29th: The Recognition A Star from the Rainbow - "10 JUST FOR THE WORLD" from "Comunità Villa San Francesco" Facen di Pedavena (BL)/ Italy.
2016 March 12: The Chiara Lubich Award for peace leadership and its values. the Focolare Movement in Italy Mundo Nuevo Association, Italy.
2015 December 10: The Cross with Crown "PRO MERITO MELITENSI" OF THE SOVEREIGN ORDER OF MALTA by His most eminent highness the prince and grand master and the sovereign of the order.
2015 December 3: A Certificate of Appointment as Publicity Ambassador of HWPL by Manhee Lee for the efforts of peace making
2015 May 13: The Medal of High Uniqueness of the City of Paris (La médaille Grand Vermeil)  by mayor Anne Hidalgo from the council of the city of Paris, France.
2014 December 19: The title and the insignia of the Star of the Knights of Italy (Ordine della Stella d'Italia della Presidenza della Repubblica) Italy.
2014 July 19 :  the Pompeo Sarnelli''''' in recognition of the role in serving the city of Bethlehem, and supporting its youth by the Cultural Association "Mons. Pompeo Sarnelli, Bisceglie", Italy.

Main Conferences (2015-2017) 
2017 June 7 : New Cities Summit - Speaker in the 1st plenary panel entitled Understanding Urban Wellbeing, and the last plenary panel entitled Healthy Placemaking. Songdo, South Korea
2017 February 4 : Speaker at the United Nations Roundtable on the Question of Palestine. Managua, Nicaragua
2016 October 1: Created and administered the 1st Bethlehem District Diaspora Convention which was held in Bethlehem, Palestine
2016 November 17 r: National Democratic Institute -  a discussion with Vera Baboun, Mayor of Bethlehem, on "Leading for Inclusion and Security: The View from Bethlehem," moderated by BBC News Correspondent Jane O'Brien. Washington, USA
2016 October 19: 2 World Assembly of Local and Regional Governments provided formal input to the New Urban Agenda (NUA) to be adopted at Habitat III, taking place in Quito, Ecuador. Signed on the statement of the world assembly of Local and regional governments to habitat III
2016 October 12-15th: Participant at the NDI's Woman Mayors' Network (WoMN) delegation to the 5th UCLG Congress of Local and Regional Leaders in Bogota, Colombia and the UN HABITAT III Conference in Quito, Ecuador
2016 July 16: Speaker in Port-Luis and Quatre Bornes MainHalls.  Mauritius
2016 April 19-20th:  A speaker in The Atlanta Summit of Churches in the USA and the Holy Land entitled 'Pursuing Peace and Strengthening Presence" Atlanta, USA
2015 December 4: Climate Summit for Local Leaders in Paris, France
2015 September 7: Speaker at the G7 Forum for Dialogue with Women headed by Prime Minister Angela Merkel. Berlin, Germany.
2015 June 26: Member of the presidential delegation to the signing ceremony of The Bilateral Agreement between the Holy See and the State of Palestine, Vatican.
2015 April 16-17th: Headed the International Conference for the Historical Cities in the Mediterranean in Chefshawen, Morocco
2015 April 4: Speaker in Middle East Institute, "Grass-Roots Governing in Bethlehem" Washington, USA.
2015 March 13: Speaker at the First Women Mayors' Summit in Avcilar, Turkey.
2014 October 10:  Speaker at the Forum of Mediterranean Cities in Naples, Italy.

References

External links
 A Female Mayor in the Heart of Middle East, 2016 Article in Asian News 
 GRACE researcher, Vera Baboun: First Female Mayor of Bethlehem 
 Grass-Roots Governing in Bethlehem: A talk with Mayor Vera Baboun 
 Palestinian women are very progressive, 2016 Article on TechnoTimes 
 Can cities be feminist? Inside the global rise of female mayors, 2016 article on The Guardian 
 Bethlehem Has New Female Mayor, Same Old Problems', 2012 article in Al-Monitor 

1964 births
Fatah members
Living people
Mayors of Bethlehem
Palestinian Roman Catholics
Women mayors of places in Palestina
Academic staff of Bethlehem University
People from Bethlehem
Ambassadors of the State of Palestine to Chile